Seema Verma (born September 26, 1970) is an American health policy consultant and former administrator of the Centers for Medicare & Medicaid Services in the Donald Trump administration. During her tenure, she was involved in efforts to repeal the Affordable Care Act, as well as reduce Medicaid benefits and increase restrictions on Medicaid. She was embroiled in ethics and legal controversies related to her use of taxpayer money while in office.

Education 
Born in Virginia, Verma was a first-generation Indian American. She and her family moved several times, living in small towns such as Joplin, Missouri, and larger cities such as the Washington D.C. area. She also lived in Taiwan for five years while growing up. In 1988, she graduated from Eleanor Roosevelt High School in Greenbelt, Maryland. Verma's father, Jugal Verma, said his daughter "grew up in a Democratic household.”

Verma received a bachelor's degree in life sciences from the University of Maryland, College Park, in 1993. She earned a Master of Public Health, with a concentration in health policy and management, from the Johns Hopkins School of Public Health in 1996.

Career

Early career 
Verma was vice president of the Health & Hospital Corporation of Marion County, and worked at the Association of State and Territorial Health Officials in Washington, D.C.

SVC, Inc. 
Verma founded health policy consulting firm SVC, Inc., in June 2001. She was president and CEO of the company, which has worked with state insurance agencies and public health agencies in preparation for the implementation of the Affordable Care Act, and assisted Indiana and Kentucky, as well as other states, in the design of Medicaid expansion programs under the ACA. In her work with Indiana, Ohio, and Kentucky, she developed Medicaid reform programs under the Section 1115 waiver process.

Ethics controversy 
In 2014, significant ethics concerns were raised over a conflict of interest arising from Verma's dual roles as both a health care consultant for the State of Indiana and as an employee of a Hewlett-Packard division that is among Indiana's largest Medicaid vendors. As of 2011, SVC, Inc. had been awarded over $6.6 million in contracts from the State of Indiana, while Verma was concurrently employed with Hewlett-Packard, earning her over $1 million during a period when the company had secured $500 million in State of Indiana contracts. In 2016, her firm collected an additional $316,000 for work done for the State of Kentucky as a subcontractor for Hewlett-Packard, according to documents obtained by the AP through public records requests. Debra Minott, former Secretary of the Indiana Family and Social Service Administration, said it was "shocking to me that she could play both sides" in reference to Verma lobbying on behalf of HP over a billing dispute with the State of Indiana. Richard Painter, former President George W. Bush’s chief ethics lawyer, called Verma’s arrangement a “conflict of interest” that “clearly should not happen and is definitely improper.” Ethics experts noted this conflicted with her public duties.

Trump administration 

On November 29, 2016, President-elect Donald Trump announced plans to nominate Verma to serve as administrator of the Centers for Medicare and Medicaid Services, the agency that oversees Medicare, Medicaid, and the insurance markets. On March 13, 2017, the United States Senate confirmed her nomination in a 55–43 vote. She was sworn into office on the Bhagavad-Gītā As It Is, a translation and commentary of the Bhagavad Gita by A. C. Bhaktivedanta Swami Prabhupada, founder of the International Society for Krishna Consciousness (ISKCON), commonly known as the Hare Krishna movement.

One of her first actions was to send a letter to the nation's governors, urging them to impose insurance premiums for Medicaid, charge Medicaid recipients for emergency room visits, and encourage recipients to obtain employment or job training as a requirement for Medicaid coverage.

Verma is a harsh critic of the Affordable Care Act (ACA) calling it a "failure". Throughout her tenure at CMS, she led President Trump's charge to repeal and replace Obamacare. Verma made substantial cuts to the ACA Navigator program, making it more difficult for individuals to obtain coverage during open enrollment. On July 25, 2018, Verma gave a speech in San Francisco in which she criticized proposals for "Medicare for all". She stated that single-payer health care would destroy Medicare, which provides insurance for elderly people, and lead to "Medicare for None."

Politico reported that Verma clashed with HHS Secretary Alex Azar over which plans would replace Obamacare, who would get credit for those efforts, and Verma's attempts to accompany the President on Air Force One instead of Azar. Verma accused Azar of sex discrimination; an inquiry by a former Trump HHS official, Heather Flick, concluded that Azar had not discriminated. It was not the first clash Verma had with high-level officials. Flick's inquiry reportedly said Verma had discussed with a lawyer a possible hostile work environment claim against then-HHS Secretary Tom Price; Verma denied she had done this.

The clashes extended to co-workers at CMS, as Verma was cited by her first Chief of Staff in an HHS investigative report as being "insecure" and someone who "lashes out" at subordinates. Verma quickly assigned her next Chief of Staff to Baltimore, "shutting him out" of her inner circle in Washington. Verma ultimately cycled through 5 Chiefs of Staff and 5 Medicaid directors during her term. Modern Healthcare reported that Verma's subordinate and former Medicaid director abruptly quit the agency after a disagreement "erupted" between them. This led Verma to ban the Modern Healthcare reporter from future media calls with CMS. The president of the Association of Health Care Journalists condemned this action as "bullying" and commented that "Verma seems to think she can bury inconvenient facts by threatening reporters with blacklisting."

On March 2, 2020, the office of Vice President Mike Pence announced Verma's addition to the White House Coronavirus Task Force.

In the weeks leading up to the 2020 election, she pushed Medicare career civil servant officials to finalize a plan to issue $200 cards before the November 3 election, branded with Trump's name, for Medicare recipients to use on drugs. The taxpayer-funded plan was estimated to cost $7.9 billion and draw from Medicare's trust fund.

One of the priorities during her tenure as CMS administrator was to make it possible for states to implement work requirements for Medicaid. The Biden administration sought to reverse those moves. She submitted her resignation from the Trump Administration 7 days after the 2021 United States Capitol insurrection.

Ethics and legal investigations 
On August 20, 2018, Verma filed a claim requesting that taxpayers reimburse her for jewelry she alleged was stolen on a work-related trip to San Francisco. Although she requested $47,000, including a $325 claim for partially used moisturizer, $349 for noise-cancelling headphones, and a $5,900 Ivanka Trump-brand gold and diamond pendant worn during meetings with President Trump, she ultimately received $2,852.40 in reimbursement. Democratic Representative Joe Kennedy III called on Verma to resign immediately, calling her actions a taxpayer "bailout for stolen goods she chose not to insure".

In March 2019, Politico reported that in her role as CMS administrator, Verma approved communications subcontracts worth more than $2 million of taxpayer funds to Republican-connected communications consultants and other expenses to boost her visibility and public image, leading to federal ethics and criminal investigations. Included in the consultants' work were proposals to have Verma featured in magazines like Glamour and have her invited to prestigious events to increase her public persona. Verma made an effort to purchase awards and honors for herself using taxpayer dollars. In July 2020, the HHS Inspector General reported that Verma spent more than $5 million in taxpayer funds to do communications work, and to help raise her profile. The report, a result of a 15-month investigation, concluded that Verma violated federal contracting rules: "CMS improperly administered the contracts and created improper employer-employee relationships between CMS and the contractors".

In September 2020, Democrats on four congressional committees concluded that "Congress did not intend for taxpayer dollars to be spent on handpicked communications consultants used to promote Administrator Verma's public profile and personal brand. Administrator Verma has shown reckless disregard for the public's trust. We believe she should personally reimburse the taxpayers for these inappropriate expenditures." The panel concluded that she "may have violated federal law," leading Congress to request a formal legal opinion from the Government Accountability Office.

Verma spent more than $3.5 million on Republican Party-aligned consultants to promote her. These consultants were paid to help her write tweets and speeches, polish her profile, and broker meetings with companies and high-profile individual, including other members of government. Verma spent nearly $3,000 in taxpayer dollars on consulting fees for organizing a "Girl's Night" party thrown in her honor, hundreds of dollars for makeup artists, as well as $13,000 to promote herself to win awards and appear on panels. Verma's consultants aimed to place her on profile-enhancing lists, such as the Washingtonian's "Most Powerful Women in Washington" list, targeted media outlets for Verma with no clear connection to CMS initiatives (such as "Badass Women of DC"), and generated ideas for potential social events for Verma to attend, such as the Ford's Theatre Gala, Kennedy Center Honors, and Motion Picture Association events. The consultants provided her with talking points on repealing the Affordable Care Act in 2017, and helped her write a 2018 opinion column under her name in the Washington Post arguing for Medicaid work requirements. Verma was often accompanied by consultants as part of her travel entourage, billing CMS up to $380 per hour. She also used consultants as drivers at a rate up to $203 per hour and hotel rooms for official travel that cost more than $500 per night, hundreds of dollars above the government per diem rate.

These consultants, including one who was awaiting sentencing on a felony conviction for lying to Congress about misuse of taxpayer funds, led communications efforts on major policy initiatives and rollouts. CMS leadership provided them with access to sensitive information on proposed rule-makings, internal plans for anticipated policy roll-outs, and other potentially non-public, market-sensitive information. One of the outside consultants that Verma paid was Marcus Barlow, who had been her spokesperson at her former consulting firm SVC, who worked on three separate contracts for CMS, earning between $209–$230 an hour. According to the New York Times, this worked out to more than double the salary he would have received as a federal employee. As late as December 2020 during Verma's tenure, Barlow accompanied Verma and other CMS officials to an official function at the White House.

In 2021, Verma said she lost her CMS-issued cell phone two days before President Biden's inauguration, resulting in the elimination of all of its stored records. Verma then failed to complete the standard form explaining how she lost her phone, the court records state. Verma was issued a new iPhone on January 18, which she returned nine days later. Records from that phone can not be accessed because the phone was locked and Verma said she had forgotten her passcode.

Post-Trump administration career 
Verma told reporters she had "no regrets" about her actions or tenure Verma joined the board of multiple healthcare firms.

Personal life 
Born in Virginia, Verma moved several times across the United States with her family, and once lived in Taiwan for five years, before settling in the greater Indianapolis area. Verma and her family live in Carmel, Indiana.

References

External links 
 
 Biography at CMS.gov
 
 

1970 births
Living people
American health care chief executives
American politicians of Indian descent
American public health doctors
American women chief executives
Indiana Republicans
Johns Hopkins Bloomberg School of Public Health alumni
People from Indiana
Trump administration personnel
United States Department of Health and Human Services officials
University of Maryland, College Park alumni
21st-century American women
Women public health doctors
Asian conservatism in the United States